List of offspring of Holocaust survivors with their own Wikipedia entries:

A

 Yitzhak Aharonovich
 Chantal Akerman
 Avi Arad
 Yardena Arazi
 Charles Ardai
 Uri Ariel
 Shlomo Artzi
 Gabi Ashkenazi
 Mickey Avalon
 Emanuel Ax
 Yank Azman

B
 
 Blanche Baker
 Gad Barzilai
 Gary Baseman
 Yishai Beer
 Avi Beker
 Jeanne Beker
 Nitza Ben-Dov
 Daniel Berger (physician)
 Tzvi Berkowitz
 Aliza Bin-Noun
 Wolf Blitzer
 Lili Bosse
 Timothy Boyle
 Benjamin Brafman
 William Breitbart
 Lily Brett
 Pedro Brieger
 John Browne, Baron Browne of Madingley

C
 
 Michael Cohen (lawyer)

D

 Judy Darcy
 Nir Davidovich
 Chaim Deutsch
 Avi Dichter
 Jessica Durlacher

E

 Sam Egan
 Steve Eichel
 Barry Eichengreen
 Bernice Eisenstein
 Freddy Eytan

F
 
 Avigdor Feldman
 Pablo Fenjves
 Emanuele Fiano
 Norman Finkelstein
 David Fisher (filmmaker)
 Dudu Fisher
 Gideon Fisher
 Shimon Fogel
 Ari Folman
 Miloš Forman
 Jean-Pierre Foucault
 George Friedman
 Michel Friedman
 Justine Frischmann
 Diane von Fürstenberg

G
 
 Marc Gafni
 Yoav Galant
 Benny Gantz
 Herschel Garfein
 Mordechai Geldman
 Julius Genachowski
 Zvi Gendelman
 Jacob Gildor
 Pesi Girsch
 Louis Gonda
 Azriel Graeber
 David Granirer
 Harlan Greene
 Yossi Gross
 Michael Grunstein
 Emil Grunzweig
 Eli Guttman
 Howard Gutman

H
 
 Michael Hafftka
 Moshe Halbertal
 Michael Martin Hammer
 Ilan Harari
 Idit Harel
 Shmuel Hasfari
 Amira Hass
 Ricardo Hausmann
 Esther Hayut
 Sandy Helberg
 Daniel Hershkowitz
 Paul Heyman
 Dov Hikind
 Uzi Hitman
 Ron Hoenig
 Chaviva Hošek

J

 Mariss Jansons

K

 Samuel Kassow
 Aviva Kempner
 Rivka Keren
 Morton Klein
 Hy Kloc
 Alex Kozinski
 Wolf Krakowski
 Karl Kruszelnicki
 Charles Kushner
 Murray Kushner

L
 
 Evelyn Lauder
 Geoffrey Laurence
 Geddy Lee
 Martin Lemelman
 Yosef Yitzchok Lerner
 Dani Levy
 Bernard Lewinsky
 Daniel Libeskind
 Hadassah Lieberman
 Savyon Liebrecht

M

 Yossi Maiman
 Haim Maor
 Yaron Margolin
 Ivan Margolius
 Aryeh Mekel
 David Miliband
 Ed Miliband
 Adir Miller
 Benzion Miller
 Agi Mishol
 Leonard Mlodinow
 Dominique Moïsi
 Goldie Morgentaler
 Yohanan Moyal
Mark Meyer Appel                           
Penny Miller nee Mazurek
Jeanie Jarmus nee Mazurek
Niel Mazurek

O
 
 Aliza Olmert

P
 
 Borut Pahor
 Sheffi Paz
 Steve Pestka
 Jeremy Podeswa
 Yehuda Poliker
 Jack Nusan Porter
 Joseph Potasnik

R
 
 Tommy Ramone
 Genya Ravan
 Arie Reich
 Howard Reich
 Ivan Reitman
 Shai Reshef
 Aby Rosen
 Marissa Roth
 Marvin Rotrand
 Dave Rubinstein

S
  
 Judah Samet
 Lydia Sarfati
 Lynn Schenk
 Robert Schriesheim
 Terese Pencak Schwartz
 Nava Semel
 Florence Shapiro
 Miri Shilon
 Simcha Shirman
 Gene Simmons
 Itamar Singer
 Hillel Slovak
 Eli Somer
 Art Spiegelman
 Jerry Springer
 Axel Stawski
 David Steiner (academic)
 Elazar Stern
 Jessica Stern
 Nadine Strossen
 Guy Stroumsa
 Katrina Swett
 Andrzej Szpilman

T
  
 Adi Talmor
 Elhanan Tannenbaum
 Austen Tayshus
 Nancy Tellem

W
 
 Yocheved Weinfeld
 Mindy Weisel
 Suzi Weiss-Fischmann
 Thomas Ernst Josef Wiedemann
 Elisha Wiesel
 Leon Wieseltier
 Zygi Wilf
 Nina Willner
 Alan Wilzig
 Ivan Wilzig
 Leon de Winter
 Freda L. Wolfson

Y
 
 Moshe Ya'alon
 Hanna Yablonka
 Shelly Yachimovich
 Catherine Yronwode

Z

 Jerry Zaks
 Hermann Zapf
 Anita Zucker
 Ayelet Zurer
 Ben Zyskowicz

References

The Holocaust-related lists
Aftermath of the Holocaust